Callista Louise Gingrich (née Bisek; March 4, 1966) is an American businesswoman, author, documentary film producer and former diplomat who served as United States Ambassador to the Holy See from 2017 to 2021. She is married to former House Speaker and 2012 Republican presidential candidate Newt Gingrich.

Early life
Callista Louise Bisek, known as "Cally Lou" to her family, was born to Alphonse Emil Bisek and Bernita (Krause) Bisek, in Whitehall, Wisconsin. Her father worked in a packing plant and her mother was a secretary. She has Polish and Swiss ancestry. She graduated as valedictorian from Whitehall Memorial High School in 1984. A music student from childhood, Callista attended Luther College in Decorah, Iowa, majoring in music and becoming a member of Pi Kappa Lambda. She graduated cum laude in 1988.

Career

In 1988, just out of college, Gingrich accepted an internship in Washington, D.C., in the office of Republican Congressman Steve Gunderson. At the end of the internship she joined Gunderson's congressional staff where she worked until 1995. In 1995, she moved to the House Committee on Agriculture where she worked as chief clerk until 2007.

Multimedia productions

After leaving the House Committee on Agriculture in 2007, Gingrich served as president of Gingrich Productions, a multimedia production company which she founded with her husband. They produce historical and public policy documentary films, publish books and newsletters, and make speeches, television, and radio appearances.

Together, they hosted nine documentaries, including The First American, Divine Mercy: The Canonization of John Paul II, A City Upon A Hill, America at Risk, Nine Days that Changed the World, Ronald Reagan: Rendezvous with Destiny, Rediscovering God in America, Rediscovering God in America II: Our Heritage, and We Have the Power. The films have sold several thousand copies.

Gingrich authored seven children's books featuring Ellis the Elephant, including Sweet Land of Liberty, about American exceptionalism, and Land of the Pilgrims' Pride, about colonial America. Both were on The New York Times Best Seller list of Children's Picture Books. Yankee Doodle Dandy, about the American Revolution, was released in 2013. From Sea to Shining Sea, about the expedition of Lewis and Clark and the early years of the United States, was released in October 2014. Christmas in America, about the history of Christmas in the United States, was released in October 2015. Hail to the Chief, about United States presidents, was released in October 2016. Remember the Ladies, about United States first ladies, was released in October 2017.

Gingrich co-authored Rediscovering God in America with her husband, Newt Gingrich. She also co-authored a photobook, Ronald Reagan: Rendezvous with Destiny, with Newt Gingrich and Dave Bossie. Gingrich is the voice for several of her husband's audiobooks.

Ambassador

President Donald Trump nominated Gingrich to be the United States Ambassador to the Holy See in May 2017, and the United States Senate confirmed the nomination on October 16, 2017. On December 22, 2017, Gingrich presented her credentials to Pope Francis and officially assumed the duties of United States Ambassador to the Holy See. She was the 11th U.S. Ambassador to the Holy See since formal relations were established in 1984 under President Ronald Reagan.

Gingrich assumed the role of Ambassador after several instances of high-profile criticism of Donald Trump and his policies by Pope Francis and his allies. During her tenure, Gingrich focused on advancing areas of common ground between Washington and the Vatican, including defending religious freedom and combatting human trafficking. In June 2018, Gingrich helped return a letter written by Christopher Columbus that had been stolen from the Vatican Archives. She also highlighted the role of women religious on the frontlines of the COVID-19 pandemic and in conflict zones and helped Samaritan’s Purse bring an emergency field hospital, doctors and nurses to an area of northern Italy hit hard by COVID-19.

Awards and honors

In February 2018, Gingrich was awarded an honorary doctorate from the Ave Maria School of Law.

In June 2020, Gingrich was appointed Dame Grand Cross of the Order of Pius IX  by Pope Francis, the highest distinction conferred by the Holy See on laypersons, in recognition of her contributions to the Church and society.

2012 Republican primaries

As part of her husband's bid to become the Republican nominee in the 2012 presidential election, Gingrich often appeared by his side at rallies. In early 2012, Gingrich began to take a more active role in the campaign, and undertook her first campaign speaking appearances without her husband. On February 10, she appeared at the Conservative Political Action Conference, giving an introduction to her husband prior to his speech. In addition, she supported his campaign through speaking appearances at Republican women's groups, meetings of Gingrich supporters, and various rallies.

Other activities
Gingrich is a long-time member of the choir of the Basilica of the National Shrine of the Immaculate Conception in Washington, D.C. and plays French horn with the City of Fairfax Band in Fairfax, Virginia. She serves as president of the Gingrich Foundation which, among other charitable contributions, established the Newt L. and Callista L. Gingrich Scholarship to benefit instrumental music majors at Luther College in Decorah, Iowa.

Personal life
Callista Bisek met Newt Gingrich in 1993 when he was House Minority Whip and she was working in the office of Congressman Steve Gunderson. Callista testified in 1999 as part of Gingrich's divorce proceedings that the couple began a six-year affair in 1993 while Newt was married to his second wife, Marianne. Newt divorced Marianne in December 1999, and on August 18, 2000, Callista and Newt were married in a private ceremony in Alexandria, Virginia. In 2002, Newt Gingrich asked the Catholic Archdiocese of Atlanta to annul his 19-year marriage to Marianne on the basis that she had been previously married. Callista, a lifelong Catholic, was instrumental in her husband's conversion to that faith in 2009. The Gingriches live in McLean, Virginia.

See also

References

External links

 Biography at U.S. Embassy to the Holy See
 Gingrich Productions website 
 
 

Living people
1966 births
Ambassadors of the United States to the Holy See
American people of Polish descent
American women ambassadors
American women writers
Catholics from Iowa
Catholics from Virginia
Catholics from Wisconsin
Employees of the United States House of Representatives
Luther College (Iowa) alumni
Newt Gingrich
People from McLean, Virginia
People from Whitehall, Wisconsin
Virginia Republicans
Writers from Virginia
Writers from Wisconsin
21st-century American diplomats
American women diplomats